The St. Michaels Half Marathon is an annual half marathon road race. The race is competed at the amateur level. Although the event does not have a title sponsor, Nationwide is considered the primary sponsor. The race is organized by the St. Michaels Running Festival, which also hosts 10 km and 5 km runs. The Festival attracted over 1,500 runners in its opening year, and approximately 3,000 in its second edition.

Course
St. Michaels Half Marathon is a USATF certified course, measuring exactly 13.1 miles. The course is relatively flat, with grades varying between +4% to -4%, while the average elevation is 10 feet above sea level. The maximum recorded elevation is 18 feet on Martingham Dr., however, the lowest is reportedly at sea level. The marathon takes place primarily in downtown St. Michaels, Maryland, although, the race for a time ventures out of the city. The 2013 event started on Seymour Ave., and finished on Maryland 33 or North Talbot St.

List of winners
Key:

Notes

References

External links
Official website
Our Second Half Marathon

Half marathons in the United States
Recurring sporting events established in 2012
Half marathon
Sports competitions in Maryland